Walter Clayton may refer to:

Walter F. Clayton, American architect, builder, and politician from New York
Walter J. Clayton III, known as Jay Clayton, American attorney and Chairman of the U.S. Securities and Exchange Commission
Walter Seddon Clayton, organiser of the Communist Party of Australia
Walter Clayton, co-founder of Noorduyn Aircraft Limited